Reuben H. Tomlinson was a lawyer, Freedmen Bureau official, and politician in South Carolina during the Reconstruction era.

Tomlinson was from Philadelphia.

He was appointed superintendent of education by the Freedmen Bureau in Charleston, South Carolina in 1865. He expanded the number of schools and hired teachers.

In October 1865 he toured Saxton School with Oliver Otis Howard and other Freedmen Bureau officials as well as dignitaries. He served as Superintendent of Education until October 1868. He was succeeded by Horace Neide and then Edward L. Deane.

He served in the Georgia House of Representatives in 1870. He was a candidate in the 1872 South Carolina gubernatorial election, running as an Independent Democrat. He also served as state auditor.

Tomlinson is also credited as a contributor in the introduction and table of contents of Slave Songs of the United States, published in 1867 and known as the first book-length collection of African-American spirituals.

The state of South Carolina has a collection of his correspondence from 1865 until 1867 when he was Superintendent of Education.

See also
South Carolina Department of Education

References

19th-century American politicians
Members of the Georgia House of Representatives
Year of birth missing
Year of death missing